The Huihui Lifa (Traditional Chinese: 回回歷法; Simplified Chinese: 回回历法; pinyin: Huíhuí Lìfǎ) was a set of astronomical tables published throughout China from the time of the Ming Dynasty in the late 14th century through the early 18th century. The tables were based on a translation into Chinese of the Zij (Islamic astronomical tables), the title Huihui Lifa literally meaning "Muslim System of Calendar Astronomy".

History
Around 1384, during the Ming Dynasty, Hongwu Emperor ordered the Chinese translation and compilation of Islamic astronomical tables, a task that was carried out by the scholars Mashayihei, a Muslim astronomer, and Wu Bozong, a Chinese scholar-official.

These tables came to be known as the Huihui Lifa (Muslim System of Calendrical Astronomy), and were published in China a number of times until the early 18th century, despite the fact the Qing Dynasty had officially abandoned the tradition of Chinese-Islamic astronomy in 1659.

Study of the Huihui Lifa in Korea

In the early Joseon period, the Islamic calendar served as a basis for calendar reform owing to its superior accuracy over the existing Chinese-based calendars. A Korean translation of the Huihui Lifa was studied in Korea under the Joseon Dynasty during the time of Sejong in the 15th century. The tradition of Chinese-Islamic astronomy survived in Korea until the early 19th century.

See also
Chinese astronomy
Islamic astronomy
Ming dynasty

References

Astronomy
Astronomical works of the medieval Islamic world